"Lovin' You" is Tohoshinki's 11th Japanese single, released on June 13, 2007. This single triggered the rising presence of the Korean group in the Japanese music industry, with the highest sales since their debut in Japan.

Live performances
2007.06.02 - Music Fair 21
2007.06.09 - Music Japan (Choosey Lover and Lovin' You)

Track listing

CD
 "Lovin' You"
 五線紙 (Go Senshi)"
 "約束 Extra NSB Mix (Yakusoku Extra)"
 "Lovin' You" (Less Vocal)
 "五線紙 (Go Senshi)" (Less Vocal)

DVD
 "Lovin' You" (Video clip)
 Offshoot Movie

Music video
The video"s plot features a man and a woman in a relationship going in a bar and walking on the street. In the end of the video the man gets run over by a car when the woman leaves him. Throughout the video it shows scenes of the members in a bar on their own or they can be seen together in a backyard.

Release history

Charts

Oricon Sales Chart (Japan)

Korea monthly foreign albums & singles

Korea yearly foreign albums & singles

References

External links
 https://web.archive.org/web/20080409203505/http://toho-jp.net/index.html

2007 singles
TVXQ songs
2007 songs
Avex Trax singles